Arianna Christine Baena LePage (born January 26, 2003) is a footballer who plays as a forward or a defender for UC Santa Cruz Banana Slugs. Born in the United States, she represents the Philippines women's national team.

Early life
Le Page was born in Santa Clara, California and raised in Lake Forest, California. She attended high school in Woodbridge High School.

Club career

Youth
LePage had her youth career in Orange County Surf Soccer Club and West Coast Girl's Development Academy.

College career
LePage has played collegiate soccer at University of California, Santa Cruz.

International career
LePage was born in the United States to an American father and a Filipina mother, which made her eligible to represent the United States and Philippines at international level.

Philippines U15
In 2016, LePage was called-up to represent the Philippines U14 team in the AFC U14 Girls Regional Championship 2016 held in Vientiane, Laos. The Philippines U14 team finished second in the tournament.

A year later, she was included in the Philippines U15 squad for the 2017 AFF U-16 Girls' Championship. LePage score her first goal for the Philippines U15 in a 3–0 win against Singapore U15. The Philippines U15 team finished second in the tournament.

Philippines U17
In 2019, LePage was called-up to represent the Philippines U17 team in the second round of 2019 AFC U-16 Women's Championship qualifiers.

Philippines
LePage received her first senior call-up for the Philippines in the 2022 AFC Women's Asian Cup qualifiers. She made her senior international debut in a 2–1 win against Nepal.

Honours

International

Philippines U15
AFC U14 Girls Regional Championship runners-up: 2016
AFF U-16 Women's Championship runners-up: 2017

References

Living people
2003 births
Citizens of the Philippines through descent
Filipino women's footballers
Women's association football defenders
Women's association football forwards
Philippines women's international footballers
American women's soccer players
Soccer players from California
American people of Filipino descent
American sportspeople of Filipino descent